Kasese Municipal Health Centre III is a Ugandan health facility found in the Municipality of Kasese, at a level of health centre three. It is one of the longest existing hospitals in the Kasese District and Rwenzururu Kingdom in Western Region, Uganda.

History
In 2011, Kasese Municipal Health Centre III was temporarily closed due to a of lack of toilets. Being the major health unit in the municipality, the administration closed the health centre after the pit latrine filled up. The Centre has been struggling with more than 87 patients who were evacuated from Kilembe Mines Hospital as a result of flooding when River Nyamwamba burst its banks.

The patients were taken to Municipal health center, St. Paul, Rukoki health center and Kagando hospital. According to James Muliwabyo of the Centre, the Kasese Municipal health Centre III lacked adequate technical resources and drugs to handle cases in need of surgery.

References

Hospitals in Uganda
Kasese District
Western Region, Uganda